Artmuza is a contemporary art gallery and a creative space in Saint Petersburg on Vasilievsky Island in Russia. Since 2013, it has been at the location of the former factory of musical instruments "Muzdetal".

History
The mechanical plant on the 13th line of Vasilyevsky Island was founded in 1938 and its first products were fireproof cabinets, beds and counters. Until 1991, the company produced sports equipment, bearings, toys and board games. Since 1991, the plant is called "Muzdetal" and is redeveloped for the production of acoustic guitars.

After a falling demand for musical instruments, the enterprise was transformed into a business center. The premises were leased to various enterprises. After the financial crisis of 2007–2008,tenants began to leave the building and on the wave of opening of various creative spaces the enterprise management decided to follow this path. Since 2013, Artmuza started operating as an exhibition hall. The official opening was on January 8, 2014. Since the first years of museum, the contest of young artists "The Muse Must Work" is held there.

Projects and exhibitions
Nikolai Blokhin (January 8 – February 20, 2014), Alex Andreev (Project Generator of Universes, together with Igor Ivanov), Roman Lyapin, Ben Heine, Dmitry Strizhov, Andrei Sikorsky, Paul Nickleen were exhibited in Artmuza.

References

External links
 Artmuza website
 Artmuza information

2013 establishments in Russia
Art galleries established in 2013
Art galleries in Saint Petersburg
Contemporary art galleries in Russia